Kevin Hart (born 1979) is an American actor and comedian.

Kevin Hart may also refer to:

Kevin Hart (baseball) (born 1982), American baseball player
Kevin Hart (footballer) (1927–2016), Australian rules footballer
Kevin Hart (poet) (born 1954), Australian poet and critic
Pro Hart (Kevin Charles Hart, 1928–2006), Australian painter